Baron  was a Japanese statesman and legal scholar in Meiji period Japan.

Early life 
Mitsukuri was born in Edo (present-day Tokyo) to a noted family of scholars working for the Tokugawa bakufu. He studied rangaku and received a posting to the Bansho Shirabesho, the Shōgun's research institute for foreign technology. In 1867, he was selected to accompany the Shogunate's expedition to the Paris World Exposition, which proved to be an eye-opener.

Meiji Bureaucrat 
On his return to Japan, Mitsukuri joined the new Meiji government as a translator. He worked closely with foreign advisors from France, especially Gustave Emile Boissonnade, de Fontarabie on drafting Japan's new commercial law and civil law codes. He also served on the Genrōin, and was active in the Meirokusha.

He later served as Vice Minister of Justice from 1888–1889, the House of Peers and as chief justice of the Administrative Court. He was also president of Wafutsu University, the predecessor of Hosei University. Shortly before his death, he was ennobled with the title of danshaku (baron) under the kazoku peerage system.

References 
 Sims, Richard. French Policy Towards the Bakufu and Meiji Japan 1854-1894.RoutledgeCurzon( 1998). 
 Wolferen, Karol van. The Enigma of Japanese Power: People and Politics in a Stateless Nation.  Vintage; Reprint edition (1990). 

1846 births
1897 deaths
Academic staff of Hosei University
Japanese educators
Japanese expatriates in France
Japanese jurists
Kazoku
Members of the House of Peers (Japan)
Mitsukuri family
People of Meiji-period Japan
People from Tokyo